Interlingua (ISO 639 language codes ia, ina) is an international auxiliary language (IAL) developed between 1937 and 1951 by the American International Auxiliary Language Association (IALA). It ranks among the most widely used IALs and is the most widely used naturalistic IAL – in other words, those IALs whose vocabulary, grammar, and other characteristics are derived from natural languages, rather than being centrally planned. Interlingua literature maintains that (written) Interlingua is comprehensible to the hundreds of millions of people who speak Romance languages, though it is actively spoken by only a few hundred.

Interlingua was developed to combine a simple, mostly regular grammar with a vocabulary common to the widest possible range of western European languages, making it unusually easy to learn, at least for those whose native languages were sources of Interlingua's vocabulary and grammar. Conversely, it is used as a rapid introduction to many natural languages.

These morphemes are the same in Interlingua; thus, Interlingua would mean 'between language'.

Rationale 
Interlingua recognises that many European languages share common vocabulary – due to the historical prominence of Latin and Greek – and therefore aims to extract and standardize the most widespread words for a concept. To qualify for inclusion in Interlingua, the presence of words must be shown in the primary control languages (English, French, Italian, Spanish, and Portuguese) or secondary control languages (German and Russian). However, words from a diverse range of languages are found in Interlingua, including Japanese (geisha and samurai), Arabic (califa), Guugu Yimithirr (gangurru), and Finnish (sauna).

Speakers of other languages can learn to speak and write Interlingua in a relatively short time, due to simple grammar and regular word formation using a small number of roots and affixes. This is particularly true for speakers with a good knowledge of Romance languages and international scientific vocabulary.

Research with Swedish students has shown that, after a year of learning Interlingua, they can accurately translate elementary texts from Italian, Portuguese, and Spanish. A 1974 study showed that students who had taken a year-long Interlingua class could translate Spanish and French texts that students who had taken 150 hours of either Spanish or French found too difficult to understand. Gopsill has suggested that Interlingua's freedom from irregularities allowed the students to grasp the mechanisms of Romance languages quickly.

History 

The American heiress Alice Vanderbilt Morris (1874–1950) became interested in linguistics and the international auxiliary language movement in the early 1920s. In 1924, Morris and her husband, Dave Hennen Morris, established the non-profit International Auxiliary Language Association (IALA) in New York City. Their aim was to place the study of IALs on a more complex and scientific basis. Morris developed the research program of IALA in consultation with Edward Sapir, William Edward Collinson, and Otto Jespersen.

Investigations of the auxiliary language problem were in progress at the International Research Council, the American Council on Education, the American Council of Learned Societies, the British, French, Italian, and American Associations for the advancement of science, and other groups of specialists. Morris created IALA as a continuation of this work.

International Auxiliary Language Association 
The IALA became a major supporter of mainstream American linguistics. Numerous studies by Sapir, Collinson, and Morris Swadesh in the 1930s and 1940s, for example, were funded by IALA. Alice Morris edited several of these studies and provided much of IALA's financial support. For example, Morris herself edited Sapir and Morris Swadesh's 1932 cross-linguistic study of ending-point phenomena, and Collinson's 1937 study of indication. IALA also received support from such prestigious groups as the Carnegie Corporation, the Ford Foundation, the Research Corporation, and the Rockefeller Foundation.

In its early years, IALA concerned itself with three tasks: finding other organizations around the world with similar goals; building a library of books about languages and interlinguistics; and comparing extant IALs, including Esperanto, Esperanto II, Ido, Peano's Interlingua (Latino sine flexione), Novial, and Interlingue (Occidental). In pursuit of the last goal, it conducted parallel studies of these languages, with comparative studies of national languages, under the direction of scholars at American and European universities. It also arranged conferences with proponents of these IALs, who debated features and goals of their respective languages. With a "concession rule" that required participants to make a certain number of concessions, early debates at IALA sometimes grew from heated to explosive.

At the Second International Interlanguage Congress, held in Geneva in 1931, IALA began to break new ground; 27 recognized linguists signed a testimonial of support for IALA's research program. An additional eight added their signatures at the third congress, convened in Rome in 1933. That same year, Herbert N. Shenton and Edward Thorndike became influential in IALA's work by authoring key studies in the interlinguistic field.

The first steps towards the finalization of Interlingua were taken in 1937, when a committee of 24 eminent linguists from 19 universities published Some Criteria for an International Language and Commentary. However, the outbreak of World War II in 1939 cut short the intended biannual meetings of the committee.

Development of a new language
Originally, the association had not intended to create its own language. Its goal was to identify which auxiliary language already available was best suited for international communication, and how to promote it more effectively. However, after ten years of research, many more members of IALA concluded that none of the existing interlanguages were up to the task. By 1937, the members had made the decision to create a new language, to the surprise of the world's interlanguage community.

To that point, much of the debate had been equivocal on the decision to use naturalistic (e.g., Peano's Interlingua, Novial and Occidental) or systematic (e.g., Esperanto and Ido) words. During the war years, proponents of a naturalistic interlanguage won out. The first support was Thorndike's paper; the second was a concession by proponents of the systematic languages that thousands of words were already present in many, or even a majority, of the European languages. Their argument was that systematic derivation of words was a Procrustean bed, forcing the learner to unlearn and re-memorize a new derivation scheme when a usable vocabulary was already available. This finally convinced supporters of the systematic languages, and IALA from that point assumed the position that a naturalistic language would be best.

IALA's research activities were based in Liverpool, before relocating to New York due to the outbreak of World War II, where E. Clark Stillman established a new research staff. Stillman, with the assistance of Alexander Gode, developed a prototyping technique – an objective methodology for selecting and standardizing vocabulary based on a comparison of control languages.

In 1943 Stillman left for war work and Gode became Acting Director of Research. IALA began to develop models of the proposed language, the first of which were presented in Morris's General Report in 1945.

From 1946 to 1948, French linguist André Martinet was Director of Research. During this period IALA continued to develop models and conducted polling to determine the optimal form of the final language. In 1946, IALA sent an extensive survey to more than 3,000 language teachers and related professionals on three continents.

Four models were canvassed:

The results of the survey were striking. The two more schematic models were rejected – K overwhelmingly. Of the two naturalistic models, M received somewhat more support than P. IALA decided on a compromise between P and M, with certain elements of C.

Martinet took up a position at Columbia University in 1948, and Gode took on the last phase of Interlingua's development. The vocabulary and grammar of Interlingua were first presented in 1951, when IALA published the finalized Interlingua Grammar and the 27,000-word Interlingua–English Dictionary (IED). In 1954, IALA published an introductory manual entitled Interlingua a Prime Vista ("Interlingua at First Sight").

Interlingua as presented by the IALA is very close to Peano's Interlingua (Latino sine flexione), both in its grammar and especially in its vocabulary. Accordingly, the very name Interlingua was kept, yet a distinct abbreviation was adopted: IA instead of IL.

The four models
Four models were canvassed: Model P and K, plus two new models similar to Model E of 1945.

Model P was unchanged from 1945; Model M was relatively modern in comparison to more classical P. Model K was slightly modified in the direction of Ido.

The vote total ended up as follows: P 26.6%, M 37.5%, C 20%, and K 15%. The results of the survey were striking. The two more schematic models, C and K, were rejected – K overwhelmingly. Of the two naturalistic models, M attracted somewhat more support than P. Taking national biases into account (for example, the French who were polled disproportionately favored Model M), IALA decided on a compromise between models M and P, with certain elements of C.

Finalization
When Martinet took up a position at Columbia University in 1948, Gode took on the last phase of Interlingua's development. His task was to combine elements of Model M and Model P; take the flaws seen in both by the polled community and repair them with elements of Model C as needed; and simultaneously develop a vocabulary.

The vocabulary and verb conjugations of Interlingua were first presented in 1951, when IALA published the finalized Interlingua Grammar and the 27,000-word Interlingua–English Dictionary (IED). In 1954, IALA published an introductory manual entitled Interlingua a Prime Vista ("Interlingua at First Sight").

Success, decline, and resurgence
An early practical application of Interlingua was the scientific newsletter Spectroscopia Molecular, published from 1952 to 1980. In 1954, Interlingua was used at the Second World Cardiological Congress in Washington, D.C. for both written summaries and oral interpretation. Within a few years, it found similar use at nine further medical congresses. Between the mid-1950s and the late 1970s, some thirty scientific and especially medical journals provided article summaries in Interlingua. Science Service, the publisher of Science Newsletter at the time, published a monthly column in Interlingua from the early 1950s until Gode's death in 1970. In 1967, the International Organization for Standardization, which normalizes terminology, voted almost unanimously to adopt Interlingua as the basis for its dictionaries.

The IALA closed its doors in 1953 but was not formally dissolved until 1956 or later. Its role in promoting Interlingua was largely taken on by Science Service, which hired Gode as head of its newly formed Interlingua Division. Hugh E. Blair, Gode's close friend and colleague, became his assistant. A successor organization, the Interlingua Institute, was founded in 1970 to promote Interlingua in the US and Canada. The new institute supported the work of other linguistic organizations, made considerable scholarly contributions and produced Interlingua summaries for scholarly and medical publications. One of its largest achievements was two immense volumes on phytopathology produced by the American Phytopathological Society in 1976 and 1977.

Interlingua had attracted many former adherents of other international-language projects, notably Occidental and Ido. The former Occidentalist Ric Berger founded The Union Mundial pro Interlingua (UMI) in 1955, and by the late 1950s, interest in Interlingua in Europe had already begun to overtake that in North America. Media coverage at the time, for example, was apparently heaviest in Northern and Eastern Europe. Frequent European coverage has continued to date, joined by media attention in South America in the early 1990s.

Beginning in the 1980s, UMI has held international conferences every two years (typical attendance at the earlier meetings was 50 to 100) and launched a publishing programme that eventually produced over 100 volumes. Other Interlingua-language works were published by university presses in Sweden and Italy, and in the 1990s, Brazil and Switzerland. Several Scandinavian schools undertook projects that used Interlingua as a means of teaching the international scientific and intellectual vocabulary.

In 2000, the Interlingua Institute was dissolved amid funding disputes with the UMI; the American Interlingua Society, established the following year, succeeded the institute and responded to new interest emerging in Mexico.

In the Soviet bloc
Interlingua was spoken and promoted in the Soviet bloc, despite attempts to suppress the language. In East Germany, government officials confiscated the letters and magazines that the UMI sent to Walter Rädler, the Interlingua representative there.

In Czechoslovakia, Július Tomin published his first article on Interlingua in the Slovak magazine Príroda a spoločnosť (Nature and Society) in 1971, after which he received several anonymous threatening letters. He went on to become the Czech Interlingua representative, teach Interlingua in the school system, and publish a series of articles and books.

Interlingua today

Interest in Interlingua has expanded from the scientific community to the general public. Individuals, governments, and private companies use Interlingua for learning and instruction, travel, online publishing, and communication across language barriers. Interlingua is promoted internationally by the Union Mundial pro Interlingua. Periodicals and books are produced by many national organizations, such as the Societate American pro Interlingua, the Svenska Sällskapet för Interlingua, and the Union Brazilian pro Interlingua.

Panorama In Interlingua is the most prominent of several Interlingua periodicals. It is a 28-page magazine published bimonthly that covers current events, science, editorials, and Interlingua. Thanks to the Internet, Interlingua has seen a resurgence over the last decade, with the number of speakers jumping tenfold by some estimates.

Community 
It is not certain how many people have an active knowledge of Interlingua. As noted above, Interlingua is claimed to be the most widely spoken naturalistic auxiliary language.

Interlingua's greatest advantage is that it is the most widely understood international auxiliary language besides Interlingua (IL) de A.p.I. by virtue of its naturalistic (as opposed to schematic) grammar and vocabulary, allowing those familiar with a Romance language, and educated speakers of English, to read and understand it without prior study.

Interlingua has active speakers on all continents, especially in South America and in Eastern and Northern Europe, most notably Scandinavia; also in Russia and Ukraine. There are copious Interlingua web pages, including editions of Wikipedia and Wiktionary, and a number of periodicals, including Panorama in Interlingua from the Union Mundial pro Interlingua (UMI) and magazines of the national societies allied with it. There are several active mailing lists, and Interlingua is also in use in certain Usenet newsgroups, particularly in the europa.* hierarchy. Interlingua is presented on CDs, radio, and television.

Interlingua is taught in many high schools and universities, sometimes as a means of teaching other languages quickly, presenting interlinguistics, or introducing the international vocabulary. The University of Granada in Spain, for example, offers an Interlingua course in collaboration with the Centro de Formación Continua.

Every two years, the UMI organizes an international conference in a different country. In the year between, the Scandinavian Interlingua societies co-organize a conference in Sweden. National organizations such as the Union Brazilian pro Interlingua also organize regular conferences.

, Google Keyboard supports Interlingua.

Orthography 
Interlingua has a largely phonemic orthography.

Interlingua alphabet 
Interlingua uses the 26 letters of the ISO basic Latin alphabet with no diacritics. The alphabet, pronunciation in IPA and letter names in Interlingua are:

 c is pronounced  (or optionally ) before e, i, y
 there is no consensus on how to pronounce sc before e, i, y, as in  'science', though  is common
Unlike any of the Romance languages, g is  even before e, i, y
a single s between vowels is often pronounced like z, but pronunciation is irregular
t is generally , but ti followed by a vowel, unless stressed or preceded by s, is pronounced the same as c (that is,  or )

Collateral orthography

The book Grammar of Interlingua defines in §15 a "collateral orthography" that defines how a word is spelt in Interlingua once assimilated regardless of etymology.

Phonology 

Interlingua is primarily a written language, and the pronunciation is not entirely settled. The sounds in parentheses are not used by all speakers.

Pronunciation
For the most part, consonants are pronounced as in English, while the vowels are like Spanish. Written double consonants may be geminated as in Italian for extra clarity or pronounced as single as in English or French.

Stress 
The general rule is that stress falls on the vowel before the last consonant (e.g., 'language', 'to be', 'requirement') ignoring the final plural  (e.g. There are a few exceptions, and the following rules account for most of them:

Speakers may pronounce all words according to the general rule mentioned above. For example,  is acceptable, although  is more common.

Phonotactics 
Interlingua has no explicitly defined phonotactics. However, the prototyping procedure for determining Interlingua words, which strives for internationality, should in general lead naturally to words that are easy for most learners to pronounce. In the process of forming new words, an ending cannot always be added without a modification of some kind in between. A good example is the plural -s, which is always preceded by a vowel to prevent the occurrence of a hard-to-pronounce consonant cluster at the end. If the singular does not end in a vowel, the final -s becomes -es.

Loanwords 
Unassimilated foreign loanwords, or borrowed words, are spelled as in their language of origin. Their spelling may contain diacritics, or accent marks. If the diacritics do not affect pronunciation, they are removed.

Vocabulary 
Words in Interlingua may be taken from any language, as long as their internationality is verified by their presence in seven control languages: Spanish, Portuguese, Italian, French, and English, with German and Russian acting as secondary controls. These are the most widely spoken Romance, Germanic, and Slavic languages, respectively. Because of their close relationship, Spanish and Portuguese are treated as one unit. The largest number of Interlingua words are of Latin origin, with the Greek and Germanic languages providing the second and third largest number. The remainder of the vocabulary originates in Slavic and non-Indo-European languages.

Eligibility 

A word, that is a form with meaning, is eligible for the Interlingua vocabulary if it is verified by at least three of the four primary control languages. Either secondary control language can substitute for a primary language. Any word of Indo-European origin found in a control language can contribute to the eligibility of an international word. In some cases, the archaic or potential presence of a word can contribute to its eligibility.

A word can be potentially present in a language when a derivative is present, but the word itself is not. English proximity, for example, gives support to Interlingua , meaning 'near, close'. This counts as long as one or more control languages actually have this basic root word, which the Romance languages all do. Potentiality also occurs when a concept is represented as a compound or derivative in a control language, the morphemes that make it up are themselves international, and the combination adequately conveys the meaning of the larger word. An example is Italian  (lit. 'flamebearer'), meaning 'match, lucifer', which leads to Interlingua , or 'match'. This word is thus said to be potentially present in the other languages although they may represent the meaning with a single morpheme.

Words do not enter the Interlingua vocabulary solely because cognates exist in a sufficient number of languages. If their meanings have become different over time, they are considered different words for the purpose of Interlingua eligibility. If they still have one or more meanings in common, however, the word can enter Interlingua with this smaller set of meanings.

If this procedure did not produce an international word, the word for a concept was originally taken from Latin (see below). This only occurred with a few grammatical particles.

Form 
The form of an Interlingua word is considered an international prototype with respect to the other words. On the one hand, it should be neutral, free from characteristics peculiar to one language. On the other hand, it should maximally capture the characteristics common to all contributing languages. As a result, it can be transformed into any of the contributing variants using only these language-specific characteristics.

The language-specific characteristics are closely related to the sound laws of the individual languages; the resulting words are often close or even identical to the most recent form common to the contributing words. This sometimes corresponds with that of Vulgar Latin. At other times, it is much more recent or even contemporary. It is never older than the classical period.

An illustration 
The French , Italian , Spanish , and Portuguese  appear quite different, but they descend from a historical form . German , Dutch  and English eye (cf. Czech and Polish , Russian and Ukrainian ) are related to this form in that all three descend from Proto-Indo-European . In addition, international derivatives like ocular and  occur in all of Interlingua's control languages. Each of these forms contributes to the eligibility of the Interlingua word. German and English base words do not influence the form of the Interlingua word, because their Indo-European connection is considered too remote. Instead, the remaining base words and especially the derivatives determine the form  found in Interlingua.

Free word-building
Words can also be included in Interlingua by deriving them using Interlingua words and affixes; a method called free word-building. Thus, in the Interlingua–English Dictionary (IED), Alexander Gode followed the principle that every word listed is accompanied by all of its clear compounds and derivatives, along with the word or words it is derived from. A reader skimming through the IED notices many entries followed by large groups of derived and compound words.

Other words in the IED do not have derivatives listed. Gode saw these words as potential word families. Although all derived words in the IED are found in at least one control language, speakers may make free use of Interlingua roots and affixes. For example,  ('jade') can be used to form , ('to jadify, make into jade, make look like jade'), and so on. These word forms would be impermissible in English but would be good Interlingua.

Word-building by analogy
Gode and Hugh E. Blair explained in the Interlingua Grammar that the basic principle of practical word-building is analogical. If a pattern can be found in the existing international vocabulary, new words can be formed according to that pattern. A meaning of the suffix  is 'person who practices the art or science of....'

Usefulness and clarity
As noted above, the only limits to free word-building in Interlingua are clarity and usefulness. These concepts are touched upon here:

Any number of words could be formed by stringing roots and affixes together, but some would be more useful than others. For example, the English word rainer means 'a person who rains', but most people would be surprised that it is included in English dictionaries. The corresponding Interlingua word  is unlikely to appear in a dictionary because of its lack of utility. Interlingua, like any traditional language, could build up large numbers of these words, but this would be undesirable.

Gode stressed the principle of clarity in free word-building. As Gode noted, the noun  ('mariner') can be formed from the adjective , because its meaning is clear. The noun  meaning 'navy' cannot be formed, because its meaning would not be clear from the adjective and suffix that gave rise to it.

Grammar 

Interlingua has been developed to omit any grammatical feature that is absent from any one primary control language. Thus, Interlingua has no noun–adjective agreement by gender, case, or number (cf. Spanish and Portuguese  or Italian , 'black female cats'), because this is absent from English, and it has no progressive verb tenses (English I am reading), because they are absent from French. Conversely, Interlingua distinguishes singular nouns from plural nouns because all the control languages do. With respect to the secondary control languages, Interlingua has articles, unlike Russian.

The definite article  is invariable, as in English. Nouns have no grammatical gender. Plurals are formed by adding -s, or -es after a final consonant. Personal pronouns take one form for the subject and one for the direct object and reflexive. In the third person, the reflexive is always se. Most adverbs are derived regularly from adjectives by adding , or  after a -c. An adverb can be formed from any adjective in this way.

Verbs take the same form for all persons ('I live', 'you live', 'she lives'). The indicative ('appear', 'appears') is the same as the imperative ( 'appear!'), and there is no subjunctive. A few irregular verb forms are available, but rarely used.

There are four simple tenses (present, past, future, and conditional), three compound tenses (past, future, and conditional), and the passive voice. The compound structures employ an auxiliary plus the infinitive or the past participle (e.g., 'He has arrived'). Simple and compound tenses can be combined in various ways to express more complex tenses (e.g., 'We would have died').

Word order is subject–verb–object, except that a direct object pronoun or reflexive pronoun comes before the verb ('I see them'). Adjectives may precede or follow the nouns they modify, but they most often follow it. The position of adverbs is flexible, though constrained by common sense.

The grammar of Interlingua has been described as similar to that of the Romance languages, but greatly simplified, primarily under the influence of English. More recently, Interlingua's grammar has been likened to the simple grammars of Japanese and particularly Chinese.

Reception 

Critics argue that, being based on a few European languages, Interlingua is suitable only for speakers of European languages. Others contend that Interlingua has spelling irregularities that, while internationally recognizable in written form, increase the time needed to fully learn the language, especially for those unfamiliar with Indo-European languages.

Proponents counter that Interlingua's source languages include not only Romance languages but English, German, and Russian as well. Moreover, the source languages are widely spoken, and large numbers of their words also appear in other languages – still more when derivative forms and loan translations are included. Tests had shown that if a larger number of source languages were used, the results would be about the same.

Samples 
From an essay by Alexander Gode:

Interlingua has detached itself from the movement for the development and introduction of a universal language for all humanity. Whether or not one believes that a language for all humanity is possible, whether or not one believes that Interlingua will become such a language is totally irrelevant from the point of view of Interlingua itself. The only fact that matters (from the point of view of Interlingua itself) is that Interlingua, thanks to its ambition of reflecting the cultural and thus linguistic homogeneity of the West, is capable of rendering tangible services at this precise moment in the history of the world. It is by its present contributions and not by the promises of its adherents that Interlingua wishes to be judged.

Flags and symbols

As with Esperanto, there have been proposals for a flag of Interlingua; the proposal by Czech translator Karel Podrazil is recognized by multilingual sites. It consists of a white four-pointed star extending to the edges of the flag and dividing it into an upper blue and lower red half. The star is symbolic of the four cardinal directions, and the two halves symbolize Romance and non-Romance speakers of Interlingua who understand each other.

Another symbol of Interlingua is the Blue Marble surrounded by twelve stars on a black or blue background, echoing the twelve stars of the Flag of Europe (because the source languages of Interlingua are purely European).

See also
 Comparisons with other languages
 Comparison between Esperanto and Interlingua
 Comparison between Ido and Interlingua
 Comparison between Interlingue and Interlingua
 Other languages
 Esperanto
 Interslavic
 Ido
 Interlingue
 Novial
 Publications
 Grammatica de Interlingua
 Interlingua, Instrumento Moderne de Communication International (course manual)
 Interlingua dictionaries
 Vocabulary
 Classical compound
 Hybrid word
 Internationalism (linguistics)
 List of Greek and Latin roots in English
 Medical terminology
 Irregularities and exceptions in Interlingua
 Willem Jacob Visser

References

Sources
 Falk, Julia S. Women, Language and Linguistics: Three American stories from the first half of the twentieth century. Routledge, London & New York: 1999.
 
 Gode, Alexander, et al. Interlingua-English: a dictionary of the international language. Storm Publishers, New York, 1951
 Gopsill, F.P.  Le historia antenatal de Interlingua.. (In Interlingua.) Accessed 28 May 2005.
 International Auxiliary Language Association (IALA). General Report. IALA, New York: 1945.
 
 Pei, Mario. One Language for the World and How To Achieve It. Devin-Adair, New York; 1958.
 Brian C. Sexton, Karel Wilgenhoff, and F. Peter Gopsill. Supplementary Interlingua-English Dictionary. British Interlingua Society, Sheffield, 1991
 Union Mundial pro Interlingua (UMI). Interlingua 2001: communication sin frontieras durante 50 annos (in Interlingua). Accessed 17 August 2006.

External links
 
 
 Collection of links to Interlingua resources
 Word Building, in A Grammar of Interlingua by Alexander Gode and Hugh E. Blair, IALA, 1951.
 Formation de parolas in Interlingua (PDF), by Ingvar Stenström, Swedish Society for Interlingua. (In Interlingua)

 
International auxiliary languages
Constructed languages
Fusional languages
Constructed languages introduced in the 1950s
1951 introductions
Romance languages